Edward Horder Cullinan  HonFRIAS (17 July 1931 – 11 November 2019) was an English architect.

Life

Born in central London to Joy, an artist mother, and Edward, a doctor, Cullinan was educated at Ampleforth College, Queens' College, Cambridge, the Architectural Association, and the University of California, Berkeley before working for Denys Lasdun where he designed the student residences for the University of East Anglia. 

Cullinan founded his own practice in 1959. The employee-owned business, Cullinan Studio (formerly Edward Cullinan Architects), was founded in 1965. Notable projects include the Charles Cryer Theatre, Carshalton (completed in 1991), the Fountains Abbey Visitor Centre (completed 1992), the Centre for Mathematical Sciences (Cambridge) (completed 2003), the Weald and Downland Gridshell (2002, nominated for the Stirling Prize) and the new library at Fitzwilliam College, Cambridge (opened 2010).

Cullinan was a visiting professor at the University of Nottingham, and was awarded four other professorships at The Bartlett (1978–9), Sheffield University (1985–87), Massachusetts Institute of Technology (1985), and the University of Edinburgh (1987–90).

In 2008, Cullinan was awarded the Royal Gold Medal of the Royal Institute of British Architects. 

National Life Stories conducted an oral history interview (C467/93) with Edward Cullinan in 2010 for its Architects Lives' collection held by the British Library.

Cullinan married Rosalind Yeates in 1961, and the couple built their own house in Camden Mews, London, by hand. They had three children: Emma, Kate and Tom.

Family connections

His grandfather was Thomas Horder, 1st Baron Horder, who was a Royal Physician.

References

External links
Cullinan Studio

1931 births
2019 deaths
People educated at Ampleforth College
Alumni of Queens' College, Cambridge
Academics of the University of Sheffield
Alumni of the Architectural Association School of Architecture
Architects from London
Chartered designers
UC Berkeley College of Environmental Design alumni
Commanders of the Order of the British Empire
People associated with the University of East Anglia
Recipients of the Royal Gold Medal
Royal Academicians